Claudio Imhof (born 26 September 1990) is a Swiss road and track cyclist, who most recently rode for UCI Continental team .

As a junior, he won the gold medal in the scratch at the 2008 UEC European Track Championships. He competed at the 2011 and 2012 UCI Track Cycling World Championships. At the European championships he won the silver medal in the Men's madison at the 2011 UEC European Track Championships together with Cyrille Thièry and the bronze medal in the points race at the 2015 UEC European Track Championships in Grenchen, Switzerland.

Major results

Road
2007
 1st Stage 4 Grand Prix Rüebliland
2008
 9th Overall Tour du Pays de Vaud
1st  Points classification
1st Stage 3a
2012
 2nd Giro del Mendrisiotto
2019
 2nd Overall Rhône-Alpes Isère Tour
1st Stage 1
2020 
 2nd  Team relay, UEC European Championships

Track

2008
 1st  Scratch, UEC European Junior Championships
 1st UIV Cup Zurich (with Silvan Dillier)
 3rd  Madison, UCI Junior World Championships
 3rd Madison, National Championships
2009
 National Championships
1st  Team pursuit
3rd Madison
2010
 2nd Madison, National Championships
2011
 National Championships
1st  Madison (with Silvan Dillier)
2nd Team pursuit
3rd Omnium
 2nd  Madison, UEC European Championships
 2010–11 UCI World Cup Classics
3rd Points race, Beijing
2013
 1st  Madison (with Olivier Beer), National Championships
2014
 3rd Omnium, National Championships
2015
 National Championships
2nd Individual pursuit
2nd Stayer
2nd Scratch
 3rd  Points race, UEC European Championships
2016
 National Championships
1st  Individual pursuit
1st  Stayer
2nd Points race
 3rd  Scratch, UCI World Championships
2017
 National Championships
1st  Madison (with Tristan Marguet)
1st  Team pursuit
2nd Individual pursuit
 2017–18 UCI World Cup
3rd Omnium, Pruszków
2018
 National Championships
1st  Madison (with Tristan Marguet)
1st  Individual pursuit
1st  Omnium
 UEC European Championships
2nd  Team pursuit
3rd  Individual pursuit
2019
 2018–19 UCI World Cup
1st Omnium, Cambridge
3rd Team pursuit, Cambridge
 2019–20 UCI World Cup
1st Team pursuit, Cambridge
3rd Team pursuit, Brisbane
 European Games
3rd  Individual pursuit
3rd  Team pursuit
2020
 National Championships
1st  Points race
1st  Individual pursuit
 3rd  Team pursuit, UEC European Championships
2021
 UCI Champions League
1st Scratch, London
 National Championships
1st  Elimination race
1st  Individual pursuit
2nd Points race
 UEC European Championships
2nd  Team pursuit
3rd  Individual pursuit
 UCI Nations Cup
3rd Omnium, St Petersburg
2022
 1st Overall Endurance, UCI Champions League
2nd Scratch, Berlin
2nd Scratch, Paris
2nd Elimination, London II
3rd Elimination, Paris
 2nd Elimination race, National Championships

References

External links

1990 births
Swiss male cyclists
Living people
Swiss track cyclists
People from Kreuzlingen
Cyclists at the 2019 European Games
European Games medalists in cycling
European Games bronze medalists for Switzerland
Sportspeople from Thurgau
21st-century Swiss people